The 2018 Classic Loire-Atlantique was the 19th edition of the Classic Loire-Atlantique road cycling one day race. It was held on 24 March 2018 as part of UCI Europe Tour in category 1.1.

Teams
Nineteen teams of up to seven riders started the race:

Result

References

2018 UCI Europe Tour
2018 in French sport
Classic Loire-Atlantique